In mathematics, a nonlinear eigenproblem, sometimes nonlinear eigenvalue problem, is a generalization of the (ordinary) eigenvalue problem to equations that depend nonlinearly on the eigenvalue. Specifically, it refers to equations of the form

 

The matrix  is singular at an eigenvalue .

Definition 
In the discipline of numerical linear algebra the following definition is typically used. 

Let , and let  be a function that maps scalars to matrices. A scalar  is called an eigenvalue, and a nonzero vector is called a right eigevector if . Moreover, a nonzero vector is called a left eigevector if , where the superscript  denotes the Hermitian transpose.

In general,  could be a linear map, but most commonly it is a finite-dimensional, usually square, matrix.

Definition: The problem is said to be regular if there exists a  such that . Otherwise it is said to be singular.

Special cases 

The following examples are special cases of the nonlinear eigenproblem.

 The (ordinary) eigenvalue problem: 
 The generalized eigenvalue problem: 
 The quadratic eigenvalue problem: 
 The polynomial eigenvalue problem: 
 The rational eigenvalue problem:  where  are rational functions.
 The delay eigenvalue problem:  where  are given scalars, known as delays.

Jordan chains 
Definition: Let  be an eigenpair.

Mathematical software 
 The eigenvalue solver package SLEPc contains C-implementations of many numerical methods for nonlinear eigenvalue problems.
 The NLEVP collection of nonlinear eigenvalue problems is a MATLAB package containing many nonlinear eigenvalue problems with various properties. 
 The FEAST eigenvalue solver is a software package for standard eigenvalue problems as well as nonlinear eigenvalue problems, designed from density-matrix representation in quantum mechanics combined with contour integration techniques.
 The MATLAB toolbox NLEIGS contains an implementation of fully rational Krylov with a dynamically constructed rational interpolant.
 The MATLAB toolbox CORK contains an implementation of the compact rational Krylov algorithm that exploits the Kronecker structure of the linearization pencils.
 The MATLAB toolbox  AAA-EIGS contains an implementation of CORK with rational approximation by set-valued AAA.
 The MATLAB toolbox RKToolbox (Rational Krylov Toolbox) contains implementations of the rational Krylov method for nonlinear eigenvalue problems as well as features for rational approximation. 
 The Julia package NEP-PACK contains many implementations of various numerical methods for nonlinear eigenvalue problems, as well as many benchmark problems.
 The review paper of Güttel & Tisseur contains MATLAB code snippets implementing basic Newton-type methods and contour integration methods for nonlinear eigenproblems.

Eigenvector nonlinearity 
Eigenvector nonlinearities is a related, but different, form of nonlinearity that is sometimes studied. In this case the function  maps vectors to matrices, or sometimes hermitian matrices to hermitian matrices.

References

Further reading 
 Françoise Tisseur and Karl Meerbergen, "The quadratic eigenvalue problem," SIAM Review 43 (2), 235–286 (2001) (link).
 Gene H. Golub and Henk A. van der Vorst, "Eigenvalue computation in the 20th century," Journal of Computational and Applied Mathematics 123, 35–65 (2000).
 Philippe Guillaume, "Nonlinear eigenproblems," SIAM Journal on Matrix Analysis and Applications 20 (3), 575–595 (1999) (link).
Cedric Effenberger, "Robust solution methods fornonlinear eigenvalue problems", PhD thesis EPFL (2013) (link)
Roel Van Beeumen, "Rational Krylov methods fornonlinear eigenvalue problems", PhD thesis KU Leuven (2015) (link)

Linear algebra